Buro Happold Limited (previously BuroHappold Engineering) is a British professional services firm that provides engineering consultancy, design, planning, project management, and consulting services for buildings, infrastructure, and the environment. It was founded in Bath, Somerset, in 1976 by Sir Edmund Happold when he took up a post at the University of Bath as Professor of Architecture and Engineering Design.

Originally working mainly on projects in the Middle East, the firm now operates worldwide and in almost all areas of engineering for the built environment, working in 24 locations around the world.

Sir Edmund Happold

Edmund (or Ted) Happold worked at Arup before founding Buro Happold, where he worked on projects such as the Sydney Opera House and the Pompidou Centre. Ted Happold was renowned within the field of lightweight and tensile structures. As a result, Buro Happold has undertaken a large number of tensile and other lightweight structures since its founding (including the Millennium Dome). Ted Happold died in 1996, but the firm claims to maintain his views on engineering and life.

History

Buro Happold was founded on 1 May 1976, with its first office on Gay Street in Bath, United Kingdom. The firm started with eight partners:

 Edmund Happold
 Peter Buckthorp
 Michael Dickson
 Terry Ealey
 Ian Liddell
 Rod Macdonald
 John Morrison
 John Reid

The King's Office, Council of Ministers and Majlis Al Shura (KOCOMMAS), Central Government Complex in Riyadh, Saudi Arabia was the firm's first major design project in 1976. Initially, Buro Happold offered only structural engineering consultancy, with a particular strength in lightweight structures, but in 1977 it added civil engineering and geotechnical engineering and in 1978 building services engineering.   In 1982 Buro Happold started to work with Future Tents Ltd (FTL) on a variety of temporary and recreational structures. The firms combined their operations in 1992, but split again in 1997.

In 1983, Buro Happold opened an office in Riyadh, and has since opened offices around the UK and internationally:

 1976 Bath
 1983 Riyadh
 1989 Leeds
 1990 London
 1991 Berlin
 1996 Glasgow
 1997 Warsaw
 1999 New York City
 1999 Manchester
 2000 Dublin
 2003 Birmingham
 2004 Dubai
 2006 Edinburgh
 2006 Los Angeles
 2006 Belfast
 2007 Munich
 2007 Boston
 2007 Toronto
 2008 Cairo
 2008 Copenhagen
 2009 Abu Dhabi
 2009 Hong Kong
 2009 Jeddah
 2009 Kuwait
 2009 Mumbai
 2010 San Francisco
 2010 Chicago
 2011 Beijing

By 1993, Buro Happold had 130 employees and eight partners. In 1998 this had grown to 300 employees and 12 partners, while in 2000 with over 500 employees the partnership was increased to 23. In 2006 the partnership stood at 25 with over 1,400 employees and 14 offices. Due to this growth and the addition of so many different services, the company was restructured in 2003 to consist of multi-disciplinary teams of engineers, each with structural, mechanical and electrical engineers supported by specialist consulting groups.

In 2005, Buro Happold launched Happold Consulting, a management and overseas development consultancy with expertise in the construction sector, and Happold Media, a subsidiary offering graphic design and media development services.

Significant amongst its specialist consultancy services are its fire consultancy group, FEDRA, and software development group SMART which worked with The University of Sheffield  to develop Vulcan software, widely used throughout the fire engineering industry. SMART also develops Buro Happold's in-house software Tensyl, a non-linear finite element analysis and patterning program for fabric structures, and people flow modelling software. Also notable is its group COSA, which undertakes computational modelling and analysis and the Sustainability and Alternative Technologies Group.

In 2007 Buro Happold became a limited liability partnership, and in 2008 appointed 18 new partners. In 2018 the practice appointed an additional 13 partners.

The firm is a limited liability partnership with 60 partners and 1,700 employees.

Projects

Lightweight structures

In 1973, before the founding of Buro Happold, Edmund Happold, Ian Liddell, Vera Straka, Peter Rice and Michael Dickson established a lightweight structures research laboratory corresponding to Frei Otto's similar research institute at the university of Stuttgart. Ted Happold was the first to introduce ethylenetetrafluoroethylene (ETFE) as a cladding material, and the outcomes of the research carried out by the laboratory led to the development of the designs for the Mannheim Multihall gridshell and a number of landmark fabric structures in the Middle East and the UK, allowing the new building forms to become generally accepted by architects and clients.

Buro Happold's early projects ranged from designing giant fabric umbrellas for Pink Floyd concerts to the Munich Aviary and the Mannheim Multihalle, both with Frei Otto, an architect who repeatedly worked with Buro Happold on projects which pioneered lightweight structures. The Mannheim Multihalle was a timber gridshell of 50 by 50 mm lathes of hemlock of irregular form, depending on the elasticity of spring washers at the joints for its flexible form. It was one of the first major uses of structural gridshells.

Following the development of fabric structures expertise on the projects with Frei Otto, Buro Happold was instrumental in further developing the knowledge and technology of fabric structures. With Bodo Rasch, a protégé of Frei Otto, and drawing on experience from the Pink Floyd canopies, they designed folding, umbrella-like canopies to shade the courtyard of Al-Masjid al-Nabawi (The Mosque of the Prophet) in Medina, Saudi Arabia. They also designed the, at the time, largest fabric canopy in Europe at the Ashford Designer Outlet in the UK.

This development of fabric structures expertise culminated in Buro Happold, with a team led by Ian Liddell, and with Paul Westbury, designing the Millennium Dome, the world's largest fabric roof and the first building of its type. The expertise in wooden gridshell structures has resulted in the design of structures such as the Weald and Downland Museum and the Savill Building in Windsor Great Park.

Buro Happold has also completed the designs of a number of cardboard structures, notably the Japan Pavilion for Expo 2000 in Hanover with Shigeru Ban and Frei Otto, consisting of a gridshell of paper tubes (the structure was reinforced with steel in order to comply with fire regulations, though the tubular structure was itself structurally sufficient). The firm has worked with Shigeru Ban on a number of other projects. Another design in cardboard was the Westborough School cardboard classroom in Westcliff.

Notable projects in the UK

UK completed projects
 One Angel Square in Manchester
 Arsenal F.C.'s Emirates Stadium in London
 Ascot Racecourse in Ascot
 The Weald and Downland Gridshell
 Perth Concert Hall in Perth, Scotland
 The Sage Gateshead
 The Savill Building in Windsor Great Park
 The British Museum Queen Elizabeth II Great Court Roof in London
The Forum at the University of Exeter, winning the 2013 Institution of Structural Engineers award for Education or Healthcare structures
 The Lowry Centre in Salford
 The Sackler Crossing in Kew Gardens, London
 Sheffield Winter Gardens in Sheffield
 The Eden Project Core in Cornwall
 The Globe Theatre in London
 The Millennium Dome and the later redevelopment as The O2 in London
 Wales Institute for Sustainable Education (at the Centre for Alternative Technology), Machynlleth, Wales; a new education and visitor centre including the largest rammed earth wall in the UK.
 Riverside Museum in Glasgow, Scotland
 Museum of Liverpool, UK
 Robert Burns Birthplace Museum, Alloway, Scotland
 The Royal Shakespeare Theatre redevelopment in Stratford-upon-Avon
 Library of Birmingham, UK
 Olympic Stadium, London, UK

UK projects in progress
 Battersea Power Station Redevelopment in London   
 Echo arena in Liverpool

Notable international projects

International completed projects

 Spertech Mixed Use Development, Noida, India
 King Tower-Lodha, Mumbai, India
 Omkar Realty, Mumbai, India
 King Abdulaziz Center for World Culture (KACWC), Dhahran, Saudi Arabia
 Zaryadye Park, Moscow
 The RWE Turm in Essen, Germany
 Persija Jakarta's Jakarta International Stadium stadium in Jakarta, Indonesia
 Grand Indonesia Shopping Town in Jakarta, Indonesia
 The Al Faisaliah Centre in Riyadh, Saudi Arabia
 The Memorial to the Murdered Jews of Europe in Berlin
 The Genzyme Headquarters in Cambridge, Massachusetts, United States
 The Danish National Opera House in Copenhagen, Denmark
 The Palace of Peace and Reconciliation in Kazakhstan
 The Khan Shatyr Entertainment Center in Kazakhstan
 RAK New Gateway Building, in Ras Al Khiamah
 Dresden Hauptbahnhof redevelopment, in Dresden, Germany
 The Smithsonian American Art Museum's Robert and Arlene Kogod Courtyard's new roof in Washington, D.C., United States (the Old Patent Office Building); a curved steel grid roof clad in square glass overlapping panels.
 Aviva Stadium (formerly Lansdowne Road Stadium) in Dublin, Ireland; a four-tiered, 50,000 seater national football and rugby stadium with a freeform transparent facade.
 Experimental Media and Performing Arts Center, a multi-venue arts center at Rensselaer Polytechnic Institute in Troy, New York
 Hawaii Preparatory Academy Energy Lab, one of the first buildings in the world to be certified a Living Building in the Living Building Challenge.
 Philippine Arena, in the Philippines is the largest indoor arena in the world in terms of seating capacity. It can hold up to 60,000 seats(max).
 The Perot Museum of Nature and Science, a new museum in Dallas
 The Anaheim Regional Transportation Intermodal Center, a rail and bus transportation hub in Anaheim, California.
 The High Line Park in New York City, a park occupying a disused elevated railway line.
 Europa building; headquarters of the EU Council and the European Council in Brussels
The Louvre Abu Dhabi in Abu Dhabi, a new art museum.

International projects in progress
 Stuttgart Hauptbahnhof redevelopment (Stuttgart 21), in Stuttgart, Germany; a project to realign the Deutsche Bahn's rail lines so they can be joined to the intra-European network. The sub-terranean station will be roofed with a public park, with organically shaped, reinforced concrete shells with petal-shaped sections terminating as skylights. The project is due for completion in 2013.
 Grand Egyptian Museum, Cairo, Egypt; the design of building services for a new museum adjacent to the Pyramids in Egypt, to house the world's largest collection of ancient Egyptian antiquities.
 The Transbay Transit Center, a transportation complex in San Francisco

Other significant activities

Buro Happold is best known for providing engineering services for buildings, but it also undertakes a large proportion of its work in civil, geotechnical and environmental engineering, and an increasing amount of overseas development work.

Buro Happold is part of the consortium appointed by EDAW to design the Olympic Park for the London 2012 Olympics. The team which built the Emirates Stadium, made up of McAlpine, Populous and Buro Happold also designed and constructed the Olympic Stadium.

In 2021, Buro Happold acquired Vanguardia Consulting Ltd, a leading acoustic and audio-visual consultancy firm, to strengthen their offering in these areas. The acquisition included Crowd Dynamics, Vanguardia's sister company.

Awards

Notable awards

Buro Happold's most recent awards include: ‘Building performance consultancy (over 1000 employees)’ and the 'Energy Efficient Product or Innovation' Award for NewMass, a phase change chilled beam at the 2018 CIBSE Building Performance Awards.

Buro Happold won the Aga Khan Award for Architecture for Tuwaiq Palace in Riyadh in 1998 and again in 2010 for the design of the Wadi Hanifah wetlands. Buro Happold also won the Queen's Award for Enterprise twice, for export achievement and again for sustainable development.  In 1999 Buro Happold engineers Ian Liddell, Paul Westbury, Dawood Pandor and technician Gary Dagger won the Royal Academy of Engineering's MacRobert Award for their design of the Millennium Dome – only the second time in the award's history that it has gone to a construction project. Buro Happold received the accompanying gold medal.

In 2007, Buro Happold won the IStructE Supreme Award for the Savill Building in Windsor Great Park.

The Aviva Stadium won the 2011 International Project Award at the British Construction Industry Awards. The Royal Shakespeare Theatre won the Project of the Year Award at the 2011 Building Awards. At the 2010 Structural Awards the John Hope Gateway building won the award for Arts or Entertainment Structures.
The Institution of Structural Engineers announced there were to be two winners of its coveted Gold Medal in 2012: Buro Happold's then-CEO Paul Westbury was one of them. Paul was selected for the award due to his innovation in the structural form, and design of sports and entertainment buildings; in particular for his leading contribution to the design and construction of Arsenal's Emirates Stadium in London, the 2006 Olympic Speed Skating Oval in Turin, Dublin's Aviva Stadium and the London 2012 Olympic Stadium. Paul has also very successfully promoted structural engineering internationally through his innovative papers on design and technology.

Stirling Prize winning projects

Buro Happold's projects have won three RIBA Stirling Prizes: the Media Centre at Lord's Cricket Ground in 1999, the Magna Science Adventure Centre in Rotherham in 2001 and Burntwood School in 2015. The Library of Birmingham won the public vote for the Stirling Prize in 2014 and the Evelina Children's Hospital won the public vote in 2006. The following Buro Happold projects have been shortlisted for the Stirling Prize:

 The Library of Birmingham in 2014
 The Royal Shakespeare Theatre redevelopment in 2011
 The renovation of Dresden Main Station in 2007
 The Savill Building in Windsor Great Park in 2007.
 Evelina Children's Hospital in 2006
 The Business Academy, Bexley in 2004
 The Queen Elizabeth II Great Court in 2003
 The Weald and Downland Gridshell in 2002

References

 Rappaport, Nina (2007). Support and Resist. London: The Monacelli Press. .
 Walker, Derek (1998). The Confidence to Build. Taylor & Francis. .

Notes

External links

 

Architecture firms of the United Kingdom
Construction and civil engineering companies of the United Kingdom
Engineering consulting firms of the United Kingdom
International engineering consulting firms
IStructE Supreme Award laureates
Construction and civil engineering companies established in 1976
Design companies established in 1976
1976 establishments in England
British companies established in 1976